Crista-galli or crista-gallii, hen crest in Latin, may refer to:
 Erythrina crista-galli, a flowering tree species native to Argentina, Uruguay, Brazil and Paraguay
 Cynosurus crista-galli, a grass species in the genus Cynosurus
 Nephrophyllidium crista-galli, a plant species
 Polylepis crista-galli, a plant species endemic to Bolivia
 Tillandsia crista-galli, a plant species endemic to Mexico

See also
 Crista (disambiguation)
Crista galli
 Galli